Thomas Cushing II (1694 – April 1746) was an American merchant, lawyer and politician who served as Speaker of the Massachusetts House of Representatives from 1742 to 1745.

Archives and records
Thomas Cushing waste book at Baker Library Special Collections, Harvard Business School.

References

1694 births
1746 deaths
18th-century merchants
Businesspeople from Massachusetts
Colonial American merchants
Massachusetts lawyers
Members of the colonial Massachusetts House of Representatives
Politicians from Boston
Speakers of the Massachusetts House of Representatives
Cushing family